Thomas Drew  (born 26 September 1970) is a British diplomat who is currently Director General, Defence and Intelligence, at the Foreign, Commonwealth and Development Office and has previously been British High Commissioner to Pakistan (from February 2016 to November 2019).

Education 
Drew was educated at Charterhouse in Surrey, where he was Top Scholar and Head of School.  He went on to read Classics at Trinity College, Oxford, graduating with a First Class degree.

Career 
Drew started his career at McKinsey & Company, the management consultants, before joining Her Majesty's Diplomatic Service in 1995. After a posting in London and a period of full-time Russian language training, he was posted to the British Embassy, Moscow in 1998 as Second (later First) Secretary heading the Embassy's economic team.In 2002, Drew returned to the FCO in London to head the EU Intergovernmental Conference Unit, the team negotiating what become the Treaty establishing a Constitution for Europe. Once the conference concluded in 2004, Drew continued in London heading the EU Enlargement and South East Europe Group until 2006, after which he was posted as the Political Counsellor to the British High Commission, Islamabad.

In 2008, Drew was loaned to the Home Office to be Director at the Office for Security and Counter-Terrorism.  He returned to the Foreign Office in 2011 as National Security Director.  He was appointed Principal Private Secretary to the Foreign Secretary in 2012, serving both William Hague and Philip Hammond. In the Queen's Birthday Honours in 2015 he was appointed Companion of the Order of St Michael and St George (CMG) "for services to British foreign policy interests". 

In 2015 he returned to McKinsey & Company on secondment, as Visiting Fellow at the McKinsey Global Institute. 

From February 2016 to October 2016, Drew was British High Commissioner to the Islamic Republic of Pakistan.  He returned to London as Director General, Consular and Security in the FCO, becoming Director General, Middle East, North Africa, Afghanistan and Pakistan on the merger of the FCO and Department for International Development in September 2020.  In March 2022 he was appointed Director General, Defence and Intelligence, where his responsibilities include leading the FCDO's response to Russia's invasion of Ukraine.

Drew has been a Trustee of the British Council since 2020.

Personal life  
Drew is married to Joanna Roper, a fellow diplomat, who is currently British Ambassador to the Kingdom of the Netherlands.

References 

 

 

Living people
1970 births
People educated at Charterhouse School
Alumni of Trinity College, Oxford
Principal Private Secretaries to the Secretary of State for Foreign and Commonwealth Affairs
High Commissioners of the United Kingdom to Pakistan
Companions of the Order of St Michael and St George